Goritsky Monastery may refer to one of the following monasteries in Russia.
Goritsky Monastery (Goritsy)
Goritsky Monastery (Pereslavl-Zalessky)